Editpress is a publishing company in Luxembourg.  It publishes several newspapers, including its flagship daily Tageblatt, the Portuguese-language weekly Correio, the weekly Lux-Post, and 50% shares in the free daily L'essentiel and the French-language daily Le Quotidien as well as weekly newspaper Le Jeudi.
 
Editpress is based in the Red Lands city of Esch-sur-Alzette.  It has close ties to the Luxembourg Socialist Workers' Party and trade unions.  Editpress's main rival is Saint-Paul Luxembourg, which is allied to the Christian Social People's Party and owns Luxembourg's main paid-for newspaper, the Luxemburger Wort.

Footnotes

Mass media companies of Luxembourg
Organisations based in Esch-sur-Alzette